China National Highway 212 (G212) runs from Lanzhou in Gansu to Chongqing. It was originally 1302 kilometres in length. In the 2013 National Highway Network Planning it was extended to Longbang, Guangxi, on the border with Vietnam. After the extension, the length is circa .

Between Lanzhou and the junction at Huichuan Town (35 or so km south of Lintao), G212 is concurrent with China National Highway 316.

It is the only main road through Wen County, Gansu. As a result of the 2008 Sichuan earthquake and again during the 2020 China floods, the road was severely damaged and had to be repaired by rescue teams.

Route and distance

See also
 China National Highways

References

Transport in Chongqing
Transport in Sichuan
Transport in Gansu
212